is a waterfall in the city of Hachimantai, Iwate Prefecture, Japan, on a branch of the Api River.

It is one of "Japan’s Top 100 Waterfalls", per a listing published by the Japanese Ministry of the Environment in 1990.

External links
  Ministry of Environment  
 

Waterfalls of Japan
Landforms of Iwate Prefecture
Tourist attractions in Iwate Prefecture
Hachimantai, Iwate